Blossvale is a hamlet in Oneida County, New York, United States. Blossvale has a post office with ZIP code 13308, which opened on July 30, 1832.

References

Hamlets in Oneida County, New York
Hamlets in New York (state)